The Zonguldak-Filyos Regional is a newly implemented regional rail service running along the Black Sea coast between Zonguldak and Filyos, with eight intermediate stations. The service restored passenger rail operations in Zonguldak that ended in 2010, when the Karaelmas Express was shortened to run between Karabük and Çankırı.

References

Railway services introduced in 2014
Transport in Zonguldak Province
Regional rail in Turkey
2014 establishments in Turkey